Mohammad Ahmadzadeh (born January 10, 1961, in Bandar-e Anzali) is a former Iranian football, basketball and tennis player and current football coach.

He played most of his career for Malavan and is also the team's head coach for the third time, serving the last term for several seasons. Ahmadzadeh changed from football to basketball and tennis from 1982 to 1985.
On 9 March 2008, Ahmadzadeh was appointed assistant coach of the Iran national football team under newly appointed head coach, Ali Daei.

Ahmadzadeh won the Qods League Forward of the Season in the 1989–90 season after scoring 16 goals for Malavan.

External links
 www.mohammadahmadzadeh.com

References

1961 births
Living people
People from Bandar-e Anzali
Sportspeople from Gilan province
Association football midfielders
Iranian footballers
Iranian football managers
Malavan players
Paykan F.C. managers
Iran national under-20 football team managers
Olympic football managers of Iran
Malavan F.C. managers
Bargh Shiraz F.C. managers
Gahar Zagros F.C. managers
Shahin Bushehr F.C. managers